TVB Xing He 星河 is a HK pay television channel owned by TVB International.

History
On 31 December 2017, TVB Satellite Broadcasting Limited was established. and is the only one to enter overseas Chinese satellite TV market. TVB Xing He Channel was launched, which is mainly broadcast in Mandarin language. TVB8 and TVB Xinghe Channel belongs to TVB were approved by the State Administration of Radio, Film and Television of the People's Republic of China for the Mainland China viewers.

On 1 January 2018, TVB Xing He revamped their channel's appearance and program line, omitting Mainland Chinese dramas from the roster. However, they still continue for Mainland Chinese variety shows. They also added an extra channel to simulcast the audio in Mandarin & Cantonese, in lieu of the traditional audio inputs from one's television.

See also
 TVB
 TVB8
 TVB Anywhere

External links
 TVB Anywhere
 TVB Xinghe Channel's Programming Schedule 

Television channels and stations established in 1998
TVB channels